The Jacob D. Goosen Barn is a historic barn in rural Sully County, South Dakota about 1/2 mile east of Onida on the north side of East Onida Road. Built in 1904, it was built with a Shawver truss roof, a form popular in other areas, but not widely adopted in South Dakota. This truss method used lighter-weight framing, which transferred the roof's dead load to the walls, enabling the removal of interior posts.

The barn was listed on the National Register of Historic Places in 1993.

See also
National Register of Historic Places listings in Sully County, South Dakota

References

Barns on the National Register of Historic Places in South Dakota
Buildings and structures completed in 1919
Buildings and structures in Sully County, South Dakota
Barns in South Dakota
National Register of Historic Places in Sully County, South Dakota